Krishan Tyagi is politician and was MLA for Burari, New Delhi.

See also
 Delhi Government

References

Living people
Delhi MLAs 2008–2013
Year of birth missing (living people)
People from Delhi
Bharatiya Janata Party politicians from Delhi